Pineapple Road railway station is a railway station under construction in Stirchley, Birmingham. It was first opened in 1903 as Hazelwell railway station and closed in 1941.

It is due to reopen under the new name in 2023.

History
Construction of the new station started in 1902 on the former B&GR mainline (now the Camp Hill line) on the border of Hazelwell, Stirchley, and Kings Heath, situated between the existing Kings Heath and Lifford stations.  The station cost £20,000 to build and was opened on 1 January 1903 as 'Hazelwell station'. It was built to serve the Priory Estate which comprised .

Originally the station sat at a level crossing with a footbridge for pedestrians. In 1928, Herbert H. Humphries, Birmingham City Council City Engineer and Surveyor, invited tenders for the construction of the Cartland Road bridge over the railway at Hazelwell.

The station closed on 27 January 1941, when passenger services were withdrawn from the line due to "wartime economy measures", and was not reopened.  The line remained open for freight and some longer distance passenger services.

The station buildings were the home of Birmingham Model Railway Club from 1963 until 1980.

Station masters
E. Coleman 1903—?
Mr. Moulton 1930—1931
Harry Snary 1937—1941(also station master at Kings Heath from 1937)

Reopening
In 2019, the project to re-open the stations at Moseley, Kings Heath, and Hazelwell received £15m in Government funding, with construction due to start in 2020 and aimed for completion in time for the 2022 Commonwealth Games. In March 2021 it was announced that funding had been found for the project, with an opening date expected in 2023. After a public vote, it was announced that the reopened station would be called Pineapple Road.

References

Disused railway stations in Birmingham, West Midlands
Former Midland Railway stations
Railway stations in Great Britain opened in 1903
Railway stations in Great Britain closed in 1941
Proposed railway stations in England